Ano Kalamas (Albanian:Mazrek) is a former municipality in the Ioannina regional unit, Epirus, Greece. Since the 2011 local government reform it is part of the municipality Pogoni, of which it is a municipal unit. The municipal unit has an area of 86.50 km2. Population 2,526 (2011). The seat of the municipality was in Parakalamos.

References

Populated places in Ioannina (regional unit)